Hølaand og Setskog Sparebank is a Norwegian savings bank, headquartered in Bjørkelangen, Norway.
The banks main market is Akershus. The banks history goes back to 1849, with the establishment of 
Høland Præstgjelds Sparebank in December of that year.

External links
 Official Website

References

Banks of Norway
Companies based in Akershus
Banks established in 1849
Companies listed on the Oslo Stock Exchange
1849 establishments in Norway